Gymnasium (German plural: Gymnasien), in the German education system, is the most advanced and highest of the three types of German secondary schools, the others being Hauptschule (lowest) and Realschule (middle). Gymnasium strongly emphasizes academic learning, comparable to the British sixth form system or with prep schools in the United States. A student attending Gymnasium is called a Gymnasiast (German plural: Gymnasiasten). In 2009/10 there were 3,094 gymnasia in Germany, with  students (about 28 percent of all precollegiate students during that period), resulting in an average student number of 800 students per school. 

Gymnasia are generally public, state-funded schools, but a number of parochial and private gymnasia also exist. In 2009/10, 11.1 percent of gymnasium students attended a private gymnasium. These often charge tuition fees, though many also offer scholarships. Tuition fees are lower than in comparable European countries. Some gymnasia are boarding schools, while others run as day schools; they are now predominantly co-educational, and few single-sex schools remain. 

Students are generally admitted at 10 years of age and are required to have completed four years (six in Berlin and Brandenburg where they are enrolled at the age of 12) of grundschule (primary education). In some states of Germany, permission to apply for gymnasium is nominally dependent on a letter of recommendation written by a teacher or a certain GPA, although when parents petition, an examination can be used to decide the outcome.

Traditionally, a pupil attended gymnasium for nine years in western Germany. However, since 2004, there has been a strong political movement to reduce the time spent at the gymnasium to eight years throughout Germany; nowadays most pupils throughout Germany attend the gymnasium for 8 years (referred to as G8), dispensing with the traditional ninth year or oberprima (except in Rhineland-Palatinate and Lower Saxony which still has a year 13; Bavaria will bring back the 13th year in 2024, North Rhine Westphalia and Schleswig Holstein will bring back the 13th year in 2025), which is roughly equivalent to the first year of higher education. Final year students take the abitur final exam.

History

The gymnasium arose out of the humanistic movement of the sixteenth century. The first general school system to incorporate the gymnasium emerged in Saxony in 1528, with the study of Greek and Latin added to the curriculum later; these languages became the foundation of teaching and study in the gymnasium, which then offered a nine-year course. Hebrew was also taught in some gymnasia. The integration of philosophy, English, and chemistry into the curriculum also set the gymnasium apart from other schools. 

Prussian secondary schools only received the title "Gymnasium" in 1918, which for some time would be the only path to university study. Due to the rise of German nationalism in the 1900s, the Gymnasium's focus on humanism came under attack, causing it to lose prestige. One of the harshest critics was Friedrich Lange, who assaulted the school's "excessive humanism" and "aesthetic idealism." He argued that they are not aligned with the aims of patriotism, duty, and the idea of Germanhood and that the country's history could also provide the education and insights offered by the models of classical antiquity. During the National Socialism era, it became virtually impossible for girls to study at a Gymnasium according to Hitler's idea, as stated in Mein Kampf, the education of girls should be conditioned only by the task of motherhood.

After the Second World War, German education was reformed with the introduction of new system, content, aims, and ethos.  The Gymnasium was retained, along with vocational and general schools.

Other methods
The Realgymnasium offered instead a nine-year course including Latin, but not Greek. Prussian Progymnasien and Realprogymnasien provided six- or seven-year courses, and the Oberschulen later offered nine-year courses with neither Greek nor Latin.

Gymnasia for girls

The early twentieth century saw an increase in the number of Lyzeum schools for girls, which offered a six-year course. The rising prominence of girls' gymnasia was mainly due to the ascendancy of the German feminist movement in the nineteenth and twentieth centuries, corresponding to the rising demand for women's university education.

Co-educational gymnasia have become widespread since the 1970s, and today, single-sex gymnasia are rare in Germany.

Historical names given to yeargroups in the German gymnasium

When primary school ended with the fourth grade and pupils left German basic secondary schools (Volksschule/Hauptschule or Realschule) at the end of the ninth or tenth grade, the gymnasium used special terms for its grade levels:

Modern languages
The introduction of French and English as elective languages in the early twentieth century brought about the greatest change to German secondary education since the introduction of the Realschulen in the eighteenth century.  Today, German gymnasia teach English, French, or Latin as a compulsory primary foreign language, while the compulsory second foreign language may be English, French, Latin, Ancient Greek, Spanish or Russian. The German State of Berlin, where secondary education normally begins in the seventh year of schooling, has some specialised gymnasia beginning with the fifth year which teach Latin or French as a primary foreign language.

Teaching English as a subject, particularly, has a long history at the Gymnasium and this is demonstrated by the time-honoured practices and subject matter that are unique to the gymnasia and could be baffling to outsiders. It is often offered in the last three years at school.

Languages of instruction
Although some specialist gymnasia have English or French as the language of instruction, most lessons in a typical gymnasium (apart from foreign language courses) are conducted in Standard High German. This is true even in regions where High German is not the prevailing dialect.

Subjects taught

Curricula differ from school to school,  but generally include German, mathematics, informatics/computer science, physics, chemistry, biology, geography, art (as well as crafts and design), music, history, philosophy, civics / citizenship, social sciences, and several foreign languages.

For younger students nearly the entire curriculum of a gymnasium is compulsory; in upper years more elective subjects are available, but the choice is not as wide as in a U.S. high school. Generally academic standards are high as the gymnasium typically caters for the upper 25-35% of the ability range.

Schools concentrate not only on academic subjects, but on producing well-rounded individuals, so physical education and religion or ethics are compulsory, even in non-denominational schools which are prevalent. The German constitution guarantees the separation of church and state, so although religion or ethics classes are compulsory, students may choose to study a specific religion or none at all.

Schools for the gifted
Gynmasien are often conceived as schools for the gifted. This, however, depends on many factors; some states such as Bavaria select their students by elementary grades or by entrance examination, and so do certain specialist schools, like the Sächsisches Landesgymnasium Sankt Afra zu Meißen, in other states. In these federal states, it is not up to the parents to decide if a pupil will attend the Gymnasium but decision will mainly be based on the performance in elementary schools. However, even "the gifted" in this sense comprise a fourth or fifth of the population. Other gymnasia in other states have no such strict provisions. Though gymnasia traditionally impose strict grading that causes students of average academic ability to struggle, many schools share the motto: "No child left behind" ("Keiner darf verloren gehen").

Common types of gymnasium

Humanistisches Gymnasium (humanities-oriented) 

Humanities-oriented gymnasia usually have a long tradition. They teach Latin and Ancient Greek (sometimes also Classical Hebrew) and additionally teach English or French or both. The focus is on the classical antiquity and the civilizations of ancient Greece and ancient Rome.

For certain subjects, such as History, many universities still require the Latinum, some also the Graecum, proof of study or comprehension of Latin or Ancient Greek, respectively.

Neusprachliches Gymnasium (focus on modern languages) 
This type of school is less traditional. It teaches at least two modern languages. In most cases the students have the chance to learn Latin as well.

Mathematisch-Naturwissenschaftliches Gymnasium (focus on math and science) 
Often combined with the Neusprachliches Gymnasium this type of schools have a focus on STEM subjects.

Previous names 
The Gymnasium with focus on mathematics and sciences used to be called Oberrealschule, the Gymnasium with focus on both modern languages and mathematics plus sciences used to be called Realgymnasium. The Gymnasium was supposed to be the humanities-oriented variety; during the Nazi era, a common term for all of these schools put together was Oberschule (literally, "upper school"). In the 1960s, school reformers in an equalization effort discontinued these names. The most practical benefit of this was that it prevented the frequent confusion among parents about the fundamental difference between Realgymnasium, Oberrealschule and Oberschule on the one side and Realschule on the other.

Special types of gymnasium

The Sportgymnasium and the Skigymnasium 

The Sportgymnasium is a school of the gymnasium-type, usually a boarding school, that has its main focus on sport. The Skigymnasium has a focus on skiing.

Musikgymnasium 
The Musikgymnasium has its focus on music. (In Bavaria) It requires to learn to play an instrument (mostly the piano or the violin) as one of their major subjects.

Europäisches Gymnasium 
The Europäisches Gymnasium has its focus on languages. It exists in Bavaria and Baden-Württemberg. In Bavaria, students are required to learn three different foreign languages. They start learning their first foreign language in 5th grade, the second in 6th grade and the third by grade 10 or 11. In Baden-Württemberg students attending the Europäisches gymnasium start learning Latin and English while in 5th grade. They pick up their third language by 7th or 8th grade and their fourth foreign language by 10th grade. By 10th grade, students also choose if they want to drop one of the languages they started in 5th grade. Later, they may drop another language. Students are required to take at least two foreign languages and fluency is a requirement for graduation. If they wish, students may also graduate with four foreign languages.

Gymnasium for mature students
There are a number of gymnasia for mature students, people who graduated from school, but did not receive an Abitur. Most of these schools have only the top three or four year groups, rather than the traditional 5th to 13th years. Examples are the Abendgymnasium, the Aufbaugymnasium and the Wirtschaftsgymnasium.

Culture of Teaching and Testing

German gymnasia follow different pedagogical philosophies, and teaching methods may vary. 
In the most traditional schools, students rise when the teacher enters the classroom. The teacher says "Good morning, class" and the class answers "Good morning, Mr./Ms. ... ." The teacher then asks them to sit down.

Up to the 1960s, students used to be supposed to call their teachers by the appropriate title, e. g. "Herr Studienrat." This is generally outdated. The headmaster might also be addressed more laxly as Herr Direktor (the correct title being Herr Oberstudiendirektor). The general mode of address is these days Mr. + surname. Teachers mostly address students by their first name.

Corporal punishment was banned in 1973. Teachers who want to punish students put them in detention or assign them boring tasks. Some have them write essays like "Why a student should not interrupt his teachers." Students may also be subjected to official disciplinary measures, such as a Verweis (reprimand), not unlike equally-called measures in the disciplining of civil-servants or soldiers; the hardest of these measures is expelling from school. Such pupils have to go to another school, or even be banned from attending state schools altogether. This is rare though. Some private schools are more easy with expulsions, along with the line that the pupil in question does not fit into the community and should thus try his fortune with a school officially designated to take all pupils, i.e. a state school.

There are written, as well as oral, exams. Written exams are essay-based and called Klausur and typically take one and a half hours. Many German students never take a multiple choice test.

Gymnasium and academic grading

Gymnasium is a school where most of the students are college-bound and stringent grading is traditional. Pupils of average ability find themselves at the bottom of their class and might have done better at another type of school.

A study revealed that upper-class gymnasium students of average mathematical ability found themselves at the very bottom of their class and had an average grade of "5" (fail). Comprehensive school upper-class students of average ability in mathematics found themselves in the upper half of their class and had an average grade of "3+".

Students who graduated from a gymnasium often do better in college than their grades or ranking in class would predict.

A "gymnasium in the south"
To many traditionally minded Germans, a "gymnasium in the south" is the epitome of a good education, while to other Germans, it is the epitome of outmoded traditions and elitism.

A study revealed that gymnasia in the south did have higher standards than those in other parts of Germany. On a standardised mathematics test provided by scientists, the study showed that students attending a southern gymnasium outperformed those attending one elsewhere in Germany.

A 2007 study revealed that those attending a gymnasium in the north had similar IQs to those attending one in the south. Yet those attending a gymnasium in the north under-performed on standardised tests. The students who did worst came from Hamburg and the students who did best came from Baden-Württemberg. According to the study, the final year students in Hamburg lagged two years behind those attending a gymnasium in Baden-Württemberg. Because students had the same IQ, the difference in knowledge can only be explained by a difference in the teaching methods. On the other hand, gymnasia in the south have the reputation of valuing knowledge over creativity, while those in the north have the reputation of valuing creativity over knowledge. Comparing students on a creativity test could produce different results.

Athletics
 

Students from all grades are required to take physical education classes. Most gymnasia have sports teams. Sports often include soccer, badminton, table tennis, rowing and field hockey.

Most gymnasia offer students the opportunity to participate in sport-related outings. In the summer months, they have the opportunity to enjoy rowing trips or sailing and in winter months, they may go skiing. Students are not required to participate, but teachers see the trips as good for building character and leadership skills and encourage students to participate. As a rule, most of these trips come with fees. A school "Förderverein" (booster club) pays for those wishing to attend, but unable to afford the fee.

Social clubs

Most gymnasia offer social and academic clubs. Most traditional among these (sports excepted) are drama, journalism (i. e. producing a Schülerzeitung) and choir. However, chess, photography, debating, improv, environmentalism, additional math, experimental physics, IT classes, etc. can also be found.

Some gymnasia require students to participate in at least one club (of the student's choosing), but in most cases, participation is voluntary.

Exchange visits
It has become increasingly common for gymnasium students to spend some time attending school in another country. Very popular destinations are English-speaking countries such as the US, Great Britain, Canada and Ireland; however, as it is increasingly difficult to find partner schools in English-speaking countries (high demand, little supply, among other things because of the limited importance of German lessons) even countries whose language is not taught at all are visited. While this is not required, it is encouraged. Some pupils might go a year or half a year abroad (and are granted some time to catch up with their studies at home), while the more general thing is an organized stay of 2–4 weeks in either country in a group of 20+ students with two teachers (who are, naturally, dispensed from every-day duties during the time).

Dress code

Generally, gymnasia have no school uniforms or official dress codes. However, students may be expected to dress modestly and tastefully. Some gymnasia offer branded shirts, but students are allowed to choose whether or not to wear them. For specific school events (like the Abitur ball) students attending them may be expected to wear formal dress, usually consisting of dresses for women and blazer and tie for men, but even this is no longer the case for every gymnasium.

In the past, Gymnasiasten wore a traditional cap, marking them as a gymnasium student. The colour of the cap differed by gymnasium and grade. In case of the Ludwig Meyn Gymnasium in Uetersen, for example, in 1920:
Untertertia-students wore green cap with a blue, red and white cord
Obertertia-students wore a green cap, with a black-and-white cord
Untersekunda-students wore a violet cap with a blue, white and red cord
Obersekunda-students wore a violet cap with a black-and-white cord
Unterprima-students wore a red cap with, a blue white and red cord 
Oberprima-students wore a red cap with a black and white cord

After the Machtergreifung of the Nazis, the gymnasium cap was banned for political reasons. Literature describing student caps was burned.Students received new clothing from the League of German Girls and the Hitler Youth. Gymnasium students were forbidden from wearing clothing that identified them as members of their school. Now, it is no longer illegal and these caps are again being sold however, few ever wear one.

At some schools, when graduating, students receive an Abitur T-shirt, which is printed with the name of the school, the year of graduation and a slogan.

Mentoring

As the new crop of students arrive at gymnasium, there is often a period of adjustment. Some gymnasia have mentors that help the new, younger students get settled in. They show them around the school and introduce them to older students. In the case of boarding schools, they also show them the city. The mentoring does not mean a student is seen as being "at risk." On the contrary, if there is a mentoring programme, all new students are likely to have a mentor.

Some schools have mentors (mostly alumni or parents) who help graduates choose a college and who arrange practical training for them.

In 2008, a mentoring programme called "Arbeiterkind" ("working-class child") was founded to assist students from working-class families make the transition. A year later, this organization had 1000 mentors and 70 local chapters.

Booster clubs

The Schulverein or Förderverein is an organization formed for financial support of the school. Members may be parents and alumni, or philanthropists. They pay for books for the school library and offer a hand to students from less affluent families, affording them the opportunity to participate in field trips and school outings.

Teacher education 
In general, to obtain a teaching degree for Gymnasia, prospective teachers have to study at least two subjects which are part of the curriculum of the gymnasia. Some decide to study three subjects or more. In addition, the university programmes for teachers always include lectures on educational sciences and didactics. After nine semesters (4.5 years) or more, students have to pass the Erstes Staatsexamen, a state-level exam, roughly equivalent to a master's degree, which marks the end of their academic training. However, having passed this test does not qualify someone at once to become a gymnasium teacher. This education is followed by the Referendariat (training on-the-job), which normally lasts for 18–24 months. During this time, the student teacher gains practical teaching experience under the supervision of experienced colleagues. This phase is completed by the "Zweites Staatsexamen," which assesses the trainees' practical teaching ability. Those having successfully completed both the first and second state examinations may then apply for a position at a Gymnasium or lesser schools.

However, the systems of teacher education differ among the Bundesländer, include exceptions and are often modified. One trend is the abolishing of the first state examination in favour of Master of Education programmes. The second state examination is not affected by this development.

Admission to a gymnasium

Admission procedures vary by state and gymnasium. Most gymnasia do not have written entrance exams. In some cases, students need a certain grade point average in order to apply to gymnasium. In most cases, students applying to a gymnasium nominally need a letter of recommendation written by the primary school teacher. The letter covers the child's academic performance, classroom behaviour, personal attributes, leadership abilities and extracurricular activities.

Based on that letter, the gymnasium determines the applicant's suitability for the school. Some gymnasia have informal interviews during which they present their school to the applicant and in turn, learn about him as the school representative works with the applicant and his parents to find out if that gymnasium is a good fit for the child.

The state of Berlin allows its gymnasia to pick 65% to 70% of their students, the rest being selected by lottery. Any qualified child can enter the lottery, regardless of previous school performance (see: Education in Berlin).

Some gymnasia are inundated with applications and some children have to resort to second or third choices.

Tuition
State-funded schools (a big majority) are tuition-free, as foreseen by the respective laws, even often on constitutional level. Segregation of students by parent wealth or income is looked down upon, to the point of being an exception to the constitutionally guaranteed freedom to have private schools (Article 7 section 4 of the German constitution, Sondierungsverbot). Of the private gymnasia, the vast majority is run by the Catholic Church on very low tuition fees (which is more easy as by Concordat, the Church receives a high percentage of the amount of money the State need not spend for a pupil in a Church-school); fees for schools who need to earn money by teaching are higher. Schools with fees generally offer scholarships.

In 2005, the German government spent €5,400 per student for those attending public gymnasium. This is less than what was spent on a student attending Hauptschule, but more than was spent on those attending Realschule. Some Hauptschule and Gesamtschule students have special needs requiring extra help, so those schools cannot operate as cost-effectively as gymnasia.

On cultural and ethnic diversity

While one third of all German youngsters have at least one foreign-born parent and other German schools are becoming more multicultural, gymnasia have remained more or less socially and ethnically exclusive. However, that is only half the truth. Children belonging to Russian-Jewish, Chinese, Greek, Korean or Vietnamese minorities are more likely to attend a gymnasium than ethnic Germans. Yet, most minorities are less likely to attend a gymnasium than ethnic Germans. A study done in Baden-Württemberg revealed that 85.9% of students attending a gymnasium were ethnic Germans. Thus the gymnasium is the German school with the most homogenous student body. According to Der Spiegel magazine, some minority students were denied a letter of recommendation for entrance to a gymnasium by their teachers simply because they were immigrants. According to Der Spiegel, teachers think minority students would not feel at home at a school having such a homogenous student body.

"Great equaliser" or "breeding ground of privilege"?

A study revealed that 50% of the students visiting a gymnasium come from families of the top levels of German society. Some people have voiced concerns that gymnasia are designed to accommodate a minority of privileged children and that talented working-class children are impeded in gaining access to gymnasium. There have been calls for the abolition of the gymnasium and a switch-over to comprehensive schools. Others want the gymnasia to target more children from poor backgrounds.

Some believe that gymnasia are "the great equaliser" and have pointed out that state-funded and parochial gymnasia have helped many students rise above humble backgrounds. Some also point to the fact that gymnasia are the only schools where working-class students nearly catch up with their middle-class peers, while in the case of comprehensive schools, the effects of social class on student academic performance are more pronounced than in any other type of school.

Progress in International Reading Literacy Study
The Progress in International Reading Literacy Study revealed that working-class children needed to achieve higher reading scores than middle-class children in order to get letters of recommendation for entrance into the gymnasium. After testing their reading abilities, the odds for upper-middle-class children to be nominated for a gymnasium were 2.63 times higher than for working-class children.

According to the Progress in International Reading Literacy Study, students from ethnic German families were 4.96 times more likely than children from immigrant families to have their teacher write a letter of recommendation. Even when comparing children with the same reading scores, ethnic Germans were still 2.11 times as likely to receive the letter.

PISA study
According to the PISA study, competency was linked to social class. After allowing for cognitive competency, middle-class children were still attending gymnasium at three times the rate of working-class children. After allowing for reading competency and cognitive competency, children from the highest social class still attended gymnasium at four to six times the rate of working-class children. According to the study, immigrant children were not discriminated against. The reason so few immigrant children attended gymnasium was poor reading skills. After allowing for reading competency, children from immigrant families were as likely as children from native German families to attend gymnasium.

ELEMENT-study
The German scientist Lehmann did a longitudinal study on the performance of pupils in Berlin in standardised tests. Such pupils used to be admitted to a gymnasium after the fourth grade and after the sixth grade. Pupils in German schools do not undergo standardised testing, but rather write essays. However, Lehmann wanted to know if those test results would predict the likelihood of admission to a gymnasium after the sixth grade and if admission to a gymnasium after the fourth grade would boost their performance in standardised tests.

Lehmann's findings were as follows:
 Performance in standardised tests was a key indicator of admission to a gymnasium; after evaluating the performance in those tests, it was clear that social class did not play a major role in determining whether or not a pupil would be admitted to a gymnasium.
 Working-class children were not discriminated against; in fact, there seemed to be some evidence that after evaluating performances in standardised tests, gymnasium admission after the sixth grade seemed to be slightly biased against middle-class children and favoured working-class children as well as those from the higher social classes.
 After evaluating the test scores, it was shown that girls were somewhat more likely to be admitted to the gymnasium than boys.
 Very few pupils who did poorly in standardised tests in the fourth grade were admitted to gymnasium. However, those who were, were able to improve their performance in those tests in subsequent years.
 Even after testing performance in grade four, those who were admitted to gymnasium outperformed their peers who were not at grade six

Study by the University of Mainz
A study by the University of Mainz revealed that of all children living in the city of Wiesbaden, 81% of children from the upper social classes and only 14% percent of working-class children received a letter of recommendation from their teachers. It also showed that only 76% of working-class children whose grades placed them at the top of the class, as well as 91% of children from the upper social classes in the same situation received a recommendation.

The big-fish-little-pond effect
According to scientists Joachim Tiedemann and Elfriede Billmann-Mahecha, there was a big-fish-little-pond effect. Children were more likely to have their teacher write a letter of recommendation if the remainder of their primary school class was not too bright. They stated, 
A high share of students with above-average academic achievement, cognitive abilities and achievement-oriented parents actually decreases students’ chances of getting into higher educational tracks (Realschule and gymnasium instead of Hauptschule).

Are children with immigration backgrounds discriminated against?
According to the same study, they are not. The researchers stated, 
After controlling for individual students' competencies, e.g. their cognitive abilities, the common assumption that children with immigration backgrounds are disadvantaged could not be confirmed. Even a high proportion of children in a class who do not speak German as a family language does not induce adverse results in recommendations.

Do gymnasia help working-class students catch up with their middle-class peers?
In 2003, a study revealed that lower-class and working-class children attending a comprehensive school lagged behind their less disadvantaged peers in terms of mathematical abilities. The same study revealed that working- and lower-class children attending gymnasium nearly caught up to their peers attending the same school. However, special care must be taken in interpreting the data, since lower- and working-class children admitted to gymnasium may be different from other pupils in their class ab initio.

Does gymnasium matter after all?
A study done by Helmut Fend revealed that gymnasium may not matter as much as is generally perceived. According to the study, parents' social class, not schooling, determined children's life trajectories. The study revealed that upper-middle-class children graduating from gymnasium (and upper-middle-class children graduating from comprehensive schools) later graduated from college and followed the footsteps of their parents into higher professional jobs. It also revealed that for every working-class child who graduated from college, there were 12 upper-middle-class children who did.

Performance of Gymnasiasten on various tests

Gymnasium and IQ 
Only a few specialised gymnasia admit their students on the basis of IQ tests. A 1999 study revealed 10th graders attending a normal gymnasium and 10th graders attending a Realschule had higher IQs than 10th graders attending a comprehensive. It also revealed that the difference was greater in 10th grade than it had been in 7th grade. The media reacted to the charge that comprehensive schools are "the place where intelligence atrophies." The Max Planck Institute for Human Development stated that nobody was "dumbed down" at the comprehensive school and that those attending a comprehensive in 10th grade did no worse on IQ tests than in 7th grade. The institute also stated that the IQ difference between comprehensives on the one hand and gymnasia and Realschulen on the other was greater by 10th grade than in 7th grade because the mean IQ of those at gymnasium and Realschule had risen. The institute did not believe, however, that attending Realschule or gymnasium boosts students' IQ. Instead, they stated that students with lower IQs who attend gymnasium or Realschule might find themselves increasingly unable to keep up and thus may drop out by 10th grade.

Gymnasium and performance on standardised tests
As has been mentioned before, gymnasia and Gesamtschulen in Germany do not administer standardised tests to their students and few students are familiar with those kinds of tests. Yet, scientists sometimes use standardised tests to evaluate schools. 10th graders attending a gymnasium have been shown to outperform 10th graders attending a comprehensive school by one standard deviation on a standardised mathematics test. That equals 2 to 3 years of schooling. Proponents of comprehensive schools have criticised such studies, stating they believe standardised tests to be biased against those attending comprehensive school. They have said comprehensives taught their students "Independence, capacity for team work, creativity, conflict management and broad mindedness" and that those qualities cannot be measured on standardised tests.

Gymnasium and selflessness
According to a disputed study evaluating students' character, based on a standardised test, those attending a Realschule or gymnasium were more likely to be respectful and considerate of other peoples' feelings than those attending a comprehensive school. According to this study, gymnasium students were more likely to be classified as "selfless" than students attending any other kind of school and those attending a comprehensive were more likely to be classified "self-serving" than those attending any other type of school. This study has been widely criticised. It has been claimed that character cannot be measured on standardised tests and that students' answers might not reflect their real behaviour. Charges were raised that questions were worded in academic language thus, students attending a comprehensive may not have understood them properly. It has also been suggested that the answers the students gave may have been influenced by social class, that gymnasium students may have been brought up to think they were selfless, while really they were not. Proponents of comprehensive schools stated gymnasium students were phony and elitist while pretending to be selfless.

Gymnasium and performance on the TOEFL
A study revealed that college-bound students attending a traditional gymnasium did better on the TOEFL than college-bound students attending a comprehensive, but those did better than college-bound students attending an "Aufbaugymnasium," "Technisches Gymnasium" or "Wirtschaftsgymnasium" (the last three schools serve students, who graduated from another school receiving no Abitur and give them the opportunity to earn the Abitur).

Defending comprehensive schools
Proponents of comprehensive schools often hold the opinion that it is unfair to compare gymnasia and Realschulen with comprehensive schools. While gymnasia and Realschulen often handpick their students, comprehensives are open to all.

Proponents of comprehensives also think they lack the most academically promising young people, who have been skimmed off by other schools. They also point out that some comprehensives (such as the "Laborschule Bielefeld" and the "Helene Lange School" in Wiesbaden) ranked among Germany's best schools.

Quotas
Germany's Left Party introduced a discussion concerning affirmative action. According to Stefan Zillich, quotas should be "a possibility" to help working-class children who do not do well in school gain access to gymnasium. Headmasters have objected, saying this type of policy would be "a disservice" to poor children, that they would not be able to keep up academically. The headmasters have also expressed concerns that children of working-class families would not feel welcome at gymnasia. Wolfgang Harnischfeger, headmaster of a well-known Berlin gymnasium, has stated, It can be noticed in children as young as kindergarten students, that children take after their parents. They emulate their language, their way of dressing, their way of spending their free time. Kids from Neukölln [a poor neighbourhood] would not feel good about themselves if they had to attend a type of school that mainly serves students from social classes different from their own. They will not be able to integrate. Every field day, every school party will show that."
He also said "this kind of policy would weaken the gymnasium" and that this would be dangerous because "German society could not afford to do without the excellence the gymnasium produces." Stefan Zillich answered this, saying that "German society [cannot] afford to have so few adults with a world-class education."

The Berlin Gymnasium lottery
In 2009, the Senate of Berlin decided that Berlin's gymnasium should no longer be allowed to handpick all of their students. It was ruled that while gymnasia should be able to pick 70% to 65% of their students, the other places are to be allocated by lottery. Every child will be able to enter the lottery, no matter how the child performed in primary school. It is hoped that this policy will increase the number of working-class students attending gymnasium. The Left Party proposed that Berlin gymnasia should no longer be allowed to expel students who perform poorly, so that the students who won a gymnasium place in the lottery have a fair chance of graduating from that school. It is not clear yet whether the Berlin Senate will decide in favour of The Left Party's proposal.

See also
 Grammar schools debate
 Gymnasium (school)
 List of schools in Germany
 :de:Abitur nach der zw%C3%B6lften Jahrgangsstufe

References

Further reading
 Matthew Arnold, Higher Schools and Universities in Germany, (second edition, London, 1882)
 Schrader, Erziehungs- und Unterrichtslehre für Gymnasien und Realschulen, (5th edition, Berlin, 1893)
 Paulsen, German Education, Past and Present, (translated by Lorenz, New York, 1908)
 A. Beier, Die höheren Schulen in Preußen und ihre Lehrer, (Halle, 1909)
 J. F. Brown, The Training of Teachers for Secondary Schools in Germany and the United States, (New York, 1911)

External links

Secondary education in Germany
High schools and secondary schools